Stanislav Sergeyevich Kozyrev (born 22 March 1987) is a Russian former professional footballer.

Club career
He made his Russian Football National League debut for FC Terek Grozny on 26 March 2006 in a game against FC Angusht Nazran.

External links
 

1987 births
Sportspeople from Oryol
Living people
Russian footballers
Russia youth international footballers
Russian expatriate footballers
Expatriate footballers in Lithuania
FC Akhmat Grozny players
FC Kuban Krasnodar players
FC Khimki players
Association football goalkeepers
FC Saturn Ramenskoye players
FC Avangard Kursk players
FC Dynamo Bryansk players
FC Oryol players